This List of Australian Group races is recognized as a list of Australia's classified Black type thoroughbred horse races.

The Pattern Committee of the Australian Racing Board (ARB) recommends which races shall be designated as Group and Listed races for the racing season. The current list is for the 2019–2020 Australian Racing season and the 2019–2020 which began on Monday, 1 August 2019.

Group 1,2 and 3 races
Click on the sort symbol at the top of the columns to sort on a particular field.

Notes:

Listed races
In addition to the above Group 1, 2 and 3 races there are approximately 280 grade 4 races which are known as Listed races.
All of these races were collectively known as Principal Races until about 1979.

Racecourse distribution

The following table displays the distribution of Group Races by racecourses.

Legend:

See also
 Group races, the European equivalent 
 Graded stakes race, the North American equivalent
 List of British flat horse races
 List of American and Canadian Graded races
 List of South American Group races

References

External links
Racing and Sports Group Race Interactive database

Horse races in Australia
Group races
Turf races in Australia
Group